Lake Apo is a crater lake in Barangay Guinoyoran in the city of Valencia in Bukidnon province in the Philippines. Lake Apo was awarded the cleanest inland body of water in Northern Mindanao Region (Region X) in the late 1990s.

Etymology
The name of the lake come from the bisaya term apo, meaning elder or grandparent. According to legend, there was a man living in the mountains who assaulted his granddaughter and was punished by the mountain deities for his disrespectful act by flooding the area forming the Lake Apo.

Geology
The lake is a crater lake, a basin formed on an old volcanic cone that was later filled with water. It was erroneously reported as a circular rift lake, as this area is not a rift zone but a volcanic area evident by the presence of nearby volcanic peaks like Musuan Peak ( to the E), Mount Kalatungan ( to the NW), Mount Dagumbaan ( to the SW), Mount Kidongin ( to the SW), and the volcanic field east of Pangantucan, Bukidnon ( to the west).

Incidents
 March 29, 2015 – 2 teens were drowned after trying to cross the lake using a small bamboo raft; the said bodies were recovered on April 1.

See also
 Lakes in the Philippines

References

Apo
Apo
Landforms of Bukidnon
Tourist attractions in Bukidnon
Valencia, Bukidnon